Abrosimovo is the name of several rural localities in Russia:
Abrosimovo, Kostroma Oblast, a settlement in Mikhalevskoye Settlement of Neysky District in Kostroma Oblast; 
Abrosimovo, Mari El Republic, a village in Vasilyevsky Rural Okrug of Yurinsky District in the Mari El Republic; 
Abrosimovo, Oryol Oblast, a village in Abolmasovsky Selsoviet of Khotynetsky District in Oryol Oblast
Abrosimovo, Pskov Oblast, a village in Opochetsky District of Pskov Oblast
Abrosimovo, Andreapolsky District, Tver Oblast, a village in Aksenovskoye Rural Settlement of Andreapolsky District in Tver Oblast
Abrosimovo, Kimrsky District, Tver Oblast, a village in Ustinovskoye Rural Settlement of Kimrsky District in Tver Oblast
Abrosimovo, Vesyegonsky District, Tver Oblast, a village in Kesemskoye Rural Settlement of Vesyegonsky District in Tver Oblast
Abrosimovo, Kameshkovsky District, Vladimir Oblast, a village in Kameshkovsky District of Vladimir Oblast
Abrosimovo, Vyaznikovsky District, Vladimir Oblast, a village in Vyaznikovsky District of Vladimir Oblast
Abrosimovo, Voronezh Oblast, a selo in Dyachenkovskoye Rural Settlement of Bogucharsky District in Voronezh Oblast

See also
Abrosimov, Russian last name